Cosmas Ndeti (born 24 November 1971) is a three-time winner of the Boston Marathon. He was the winner of the 1993, 1994, and 1995 races. He set the course record in 1994 with a time of 2:07:15, which was also the best marathon performance in 1994. That course record stood for 12 years until it was broken by one second when Robert Kipkoech Cheruiyot, a fellow Kenyan, won the 2006 race.

He received a three-month ban for doping, after failing a test for ephedrine at the 1988 IAAF World Cross Country Championships. This made him the first doping ban case in Kenyan history.

Achievements

See also
List of winners of the Boston Marathon
List of doping cases in athletics

References

External links

Cosmas Ndeti
Cosmos Ndeti

1971 births
Living people
Kenyan male long-distance runners
Kenyan male marathon runners
Boston Marathon male winners
World Athletics Championships athletes for Kenya
Doping cases in athletics
Kenyan sportspeople in doping cases